The 2016 Major League Soccer season featured 20 total clubs (17 based in the United States, 3 based in Canada). The regular season began on March 6 and ended on October 23. The playoffs began on October 26 and ended on December 10. The defending MLS Cup champions were the Portland Timbers, while the New York Red Bulls were the defending Supporters' Shield winners. FC Dallas won the Supporter's Shield for the first time, and the Seattle Sounders FC won their first MLS Cup in their history after defeating Toronto FC 5–4 in a penalty kick shootout, after playing to a 0–0 result after regulation and added extra time.

Teams

Stadiums and locations

Personnel and sponsorship

Note: All teams use Adidas as kit manufacturer.

Managerial changes

Regular season

Conference tables

Eastern Conference

Western Conference

Overall table

MLS Cup Playoffs

Bracket

Knockout round

Conference semifinals

Conference finals

MLS Cup

Attendance

Average home attendances

Ranked from highest to lowest average attendance.

Highest attendances 
Regular season

Player statistics

Goals

Assists

Shutouts

Hat-tricks

Scoring
First goal of the season: Thomas McNamara for New York City FC against Chicago Fire, 10 minutes (March 6, 2016)
Fastest goal of the season: Octavio Rivero for Vancouver Whitecaps FC against New York City FC, 38 seconds (April 15, 2016)
Latest goal of the season: Marco Pappa for Colorado Rapids against LA Galaxy, 95 minutes (March 12, 2016)

Discipline
First yellow card of the season: Daniel Lovitz for Toronto FC against New York Red Bulls, 38 minutes (March 6, 2016)
First red card of the season: Demar Phillips for Real Salt Lake against Orlando City SC, 20 minutes (March 6, 2016) – Second yellow card
First straight red card of the season: Darwin Cerén for Orlando City SC against Real Salt Lake, 47 minutes (March 6, 2016)
First player suspended by yellow card accumulation: Carlos Gruezo for FC Dallas

Awards

Monthly awards

Weekly awards

Team of the Week

End-of-season awards

MLS Best XI

Source:

Player transfers

Allocation ranking
The allocation ranking is the mechanism used to determine which MLS club has first priority to acquire a player who is in the MLS allocation list. The MLS allocation list contains select U.S. National Team players and players transferred outside of MLS garnering a transfer fee of at least $500,000. The allocations will be ranked in reverse order of finish for the 2015 season, taking playoff performance into account.

Once the club uses its allocation ranking to acquire a player, it drops to the bottom of the list. A ranking can be traded provided that part of the compensation received in return is another club's ranking. At all times each club is assigned one ranking. The rankings reset at the end of each MLS season.

Television

United States
In the 2016 MLS season, 96 games aired in the United States on national television. English-language broadcasts once again included Soccer Sunday doubleheaders — 29 games on ESPN and 5 on ESPN2 (mainly on Sunday afternoons), 4 on Fox, and 30 on Fox Sports 1 (mainly on Sunday evenings). The 2016 season marked MLS's debut on the Fox network channel.  Spanish-language broadcasts included 28 games on UniMás (mainly on Friday evenings).

Notes: 
 All viewership numbers are in thousands.
 Average viewership for the previous 2015 season was 245,000 (ESPN2), 197,000 (FS1), and 244,000 (Univ).

Other countries
TSN, RDS and Sportsnet aired matches in Canada of primarily the three Canadian-based teams.

MLS aired on Sky Sports in the United Kingdom, Eurosport in Continental Europe, Abu Dhabi Media in the Middle East and North Africa, Letv Sports in China, beIN Sports in Asia-Pacific, ESPN and Fox Sports in Latin America, SporTV in Brazil and Fox Sports in Africa.

2016 attendances
The following is a list of the average attendance for each of the twenty MLS teams at their regular-season games. It includes the team, the average attendance for the 2016 regular season and the 2015 regular season, the percentage change in attendance from season-to-season, the home venue, the home venue's capacity, and the percent of capacity.

Note: Vancouver's and Seattle's attendances are both over 100% capacity because, for select games, they open up additional sections above the regular limited capacity. Orlando's and New England's attendances are over 100% because their capacities are artificial; both teams regularly sell more tickets than the limit.  San Jose's attendance is over 100% capacity because they played one game at Levi's Stadium (68,000 capacity).

Coaches

Eastern Conference
 Chicago Fire: Veljko Paunović
 Columbus Crew SC: Gregg Berhalter
 D.C. United: Ben Olsen
 Montreal Impact: Mauro Biello
 New England Revolution: Jay Heaps
 New York City FC: Patrick Vieira
 New York Red Bulls: Jesse Marsch
 Orlando City SC: Jason Kreis
 Philadelphia Union: Jim Curtin
 Toronto FC: Greg Vanney

Western Conference
 Colorado Rapids: Pablo Mastroeni
 FC Dallas: Óscar Pareja
 Houston Dynamo: Owen Coyle, Wade Barrett and Wílmer Cabrera
 Los Angeles Galaxy: Bruce Arena
 Portland Timbers: Caleb Porter
 Real Salt Lake: Jeff Cassar
 San Jose Earthquakes: Dominic Kinnear
 Seattle Sounders FC: Sigi Schmid and Brian Schmetzer
 Sporting Kansas City: Peter Vermes
 Vancouver Whitecaps FC: Carl Robinson

See also
 List of Major League Soccer transfers 2016
 2016 MLS Cup Playoffs

References 

http://www.mlssoccer.com/post/2016/09/06/mls-announces-broadcast-schedule-format-audi-2016-mls-cup-playoffs

External links
 

 
2016
1